State Road 714 (SR 714) is a  east–west highway serving northern Martin County, Florida, running from just west of Interstate 95 (I-95) near Palm City to an intersection with Southeast Ocean Boulevard (SR A1A and County Road A1A or CR A1A) in Stuart. The route is known locally as Martin Highway, Martin Downs Boulevard, and Southeast Monterey Road.

Route description

West of State Road 76, SR 714 was primarily a rural road passing near Palm City before entering the wetlands between Lake Okeechobee and the coast; east of SR 76, State Road 714 is primarily a commercial road, passing near Witham Field, an airport near the eastern end of the route and just outside the Stuart city limit.

To the east of the Turnpike interchange, Martin Highway is another section of County Road 714.

History
In the 1945 renumbering, SR 714 was formed using the older State Road 111, with the route running from SR 710 to US 1. At one point, the western terminus was truncated to Florida's Turnpike (SR 91), five miles (8 km) to the east of the current western terminus, and extended to SR A1A at the eastern end.

SR 714 has recently been connected with Port St. Lucie Boulevard, extending north from the Citrus Boulevard (County Road 76A) intersection.

Major intersections

References

External links

714
714
714